The 2015–16 season was Northampton Town's 119th season of existence and their seventh consecutive season in League Two. Along with competing in League Two, the club participated in the FA Cup, League Cup and League Trophy. The season ran from 1 July 2015 to 30 June 2016.

Players

Pre-season
On 8 May 2015, Northampton Town announced they would face Worthing and Burgess Hill Town in a pre-season friendly. On 15 May 2015, Northampton Town confirmed they would kick-off pre-season against Northampton Sileby Rangers. On 19 May 2015, Northampton Town announced Derby County will visit in pre-season. On 12 June 2015, Northampton Town announced they will visit Sheffield.

Competitions

League Two

League table

Results summary

League position by match

Matches

On 17 June 2015, the fixtures for the forthcoming season were announced.

FA Cup

On 26 October 2015, the first round draw was made, Northampton Town were drawn at away against Coventry City.

Capital One Cup

On 16 June 2015, the first round draw was made, Northampton Town were drawn at home against Blackpool.

Football League Trophy

On 8 August 2015, live on Soccer AM the draw for the first round of the Football League Trophy was drawn by Toni Duggan and Alex Scott. Cobblers will host Colchester United. On 5 September 2015, the second round draw was shown live on Soccer AM and drawn by Charlie Austin and Ed Skrein. Northampton were drawn away to Millwall.

Appearances, goals and cards

Clean sheets 
Includes all competitive matches.

Scores overview
Northampton Town' score given first.

Awards

Club awards
At the end of the season, Northampton's annual award ceremony, including categories voted for by the players and backroom staff, the supporters, will see the players recognised for their achievements for the club throughout the 2015–16 season.

Divisional awards

Transfers

Transfers in

Transfers out

Total income:  £500,000

Loans in

Loans out

References

Northampton Town
Northampton Town F.C. seasons